Lakta Sara (also Romanized as Lāktār Sarā) is a village in Gil Dulab Rural District, in the Central District of Rezvanshahr County, Gilan Province, Iran. At the 2006 census, its population was 423, in 97 families.

References 

Populated places in Rezvanshahr County